"Shiver" is a song co-written and recorded by Australian country music artist Jamie O'Neal.  It was released in September 2001 as the third single and title track from the album Shiver.  The song reached #21 on the Billboard Hot Country Singles & Tracks chart.  The song was written O'Neal, Lisa Drew and Shaye Smith.

Chart performance

References

2001 singles
2000 songs
Jamie O'Neal songs
Songs written by Jamie O'Neal
Songs written by Shaye Smith
Song recordings produced by Keith Stegall
Mercury Records singles